The 1949–50 Scottish Cup was the 65th staging of Scotland's most prestigious football knockout competition. The Cup was won by Rangers who defeated East Fife in the final.

First round

Replays

Second round

Replays

Second Replays

Third round

Quarter-finals

Replays

Second Replays

Semi-finals

Replays

Final

Teams

See also
1949–50 in Scottish football
1949–50 Scottish League Cup

References

External links
 Video highlights from official Pathé News archive

Scottish Cup seasons
1949–50 in Scottish football
Scot